Yadgar Muhammad Mirza (1452 – 1470) was the Timurid ruler of Herat in opposition to Sultan Husayn Mirza Bayqarah for 6 weeks of 1470.

Yadgar Muhammad Mirza was born to Sultan Muhammad bin Baysonqor, who was a grandson of Shah Rukh. It was his family ties that caused Uzun Hasan, Sultan of the Ak Koyunlu confederation, to hand over to him Abu Sa'id Mirza, whom he had defeated and captured at the Battle of Qarabagh in 1469. Abu Sa'id, who had previously ordered the execution of Gawhar Shad, Yadigar Muhammad Mirza's great-grandmother,  was subsequently killed.

Later in 1469, Uzun Hasan had Yadgar Muhammad Mirza proclaimed as Abu Sa'id's successor and provided him with Timurid forces so that he could take over Khurasan, which was then controlled by Sultan Husayn Mirza Bayqarah. Although Yadgar Muhammad Mirza was defeated by Husayn in battle in September, fresh reinforcements were sent by the Ak Koyunlu leader. Furthermore, two of Uzun Hasan's sons arrived to assist him. Eventually Husayn was compelled to evacuate Herat, which Yadgar Muhammad Mirza occupied in July 1470. Despite this, his troops were unreliable and Husayn re-entered Herat six weeks later. Yadgar Muhammad Mirza, who was captured, was promptly executed. He was the last descendant of Shah Rukh to play a dominant role in the politics of the Timurid principalities.

References
 Peter Jackson (1986). The Cambridge History of Iran, Volume Six: The Timurid and Safavid Periods. 

1450s births
1470 deaths
Timurid monarchs
Year of birth unknown
15th-century monarchs in Asia
Executed monarchs
15th-century executions
Monarchs taken prisoner in wartime